Method Actor is an eponymous album of the band Method Actor released in 1988 featuring American singer Eva Cassidy. It was unofficially re-released on CD in 2002.

Track listing 
 "Getting Out" (David Christopher) – 4:19
 "Look in to My Eyes" (Christopher) – 4:16
 "When It's Too Late" (Christopher) – 5:00
 "Laugh With Me" (Christopher) – 3:43
 "Stay" (Christopher) – 5:24
 "Little Children" (Christopher, Tony Taylor) – 3:31
 "Forever" (Christopher) – 5:51
 "End the Rain" (Christopher) – 4:21
 "How Will It End" (Christopher, Ron Kent) – 3:38
 "The Waiting Is Over" (Christopher) – 3:28

Personnel 
The group Method Actor
 Eva Cassidy – vocals
 Jimmy Campbell – drums
 David Christopher – acoustic guitar, electric guitar, keyboards
 Kenn Fiester – bass
 Robert Fiester – guitar

Production 
 Producer: David Christopher
 Engineer: Chris Biondo
 Liner Notes: David Christopher
 Cover design sketches: Eva Cassidy

References

External links 
 https://web.archive.org/web/20130115043359/http://evacassidy.org/eva/methodactor.htm

Eva Cassidy albums
1988 debut albums